KTSL (101.9 FM) is an Air 1 network affiliate radio station broadcasting a Christian worship format. Licensed to Medical Lake, Washington, the station serves the Spokane metropolitan area.  KTSL is owned by EMF Broadcasting, a subsidiary of the Educational Media Foundation.

History

On , the station first signed on the air.  It originally had the call sign KAAR and broadcast at 95.3 MHz.  In 1991, it moved to 101.9 MHz, initially called "The Word In Music" and later "Power 101.9", to reflect its Christian rock sound. In July 2001, Power 101.9 changed its name to "Spirit 101.9", also changing its format to a more worship-styled music. 

On July 4, 2005, after seeing its ratings drop, Spirit 101.9 was changed back to Christian rock and called "101.9 Spirit FM".  As of May 2008, KTSL is broadcasting the Air 1 Radio Network, an adult contemporary format playing well established songs combined with worship music. The KTSL call letters were once used on channel 2 in Los Angeles, now KCBS-TV.

References

External links

TSL
TSL
Air1 radio stations
Radio stations established in 1990
1990 establishments in Washington (state)
Educational Media Foundation radio stations